Jocelyn is a surname and first name. It is a unisex (male/female) name. Variants include Jocelin, Joceline, Jocelyne, Jocelynn, Jocelynne, Joscelin, Josceline, Joscelyn, Joscelynn, Joscelynne, Joseline, Joselyn, Joselyne, Joslin, Joslyn, Josselin, Joslynn,Josselyn, and Josslyn. The name may derive from Josselin, a locality in Brittany, France, and have been introduced to England after the Norman Conquest. It may also derive from the Germanic name Gauzlin, also spelled Gozlin or Goslin. It is Latinized as Iudocus or Judocus, from Breton Iodoc, diminutive of iudh ("lord").

In French, the spelling "Jocelyn" is exclusively male. The female counterpart is spelled "Jocelyne".

Given name

Jocelyn
 Goscelin, 11th century hagiographer, also known as Jocelyn
 Joss Ackland, British actor whose birth name is Sidney Edmond Jocelyn Ackland
 Jocelyn Angloma, French-Guadeloupean football player
 Jocelyn Barrow, British educator, community activist and politician
 Jocelyn Bell Burnell, UK astronomer
 Jocelyn Bioh, Ghanaian-American writer and actor
 Jocelyn Brooke, British author
 Jocelyn Brown, American singer
 Jocelyn Burdick, American politician
 Jocelyn de Brakelond, 12th century chronicler
 Jocelyn Enriquez, American singer
 Jocelyn Gill, American astronomer
 Jocelyn Godefroi, British translator
 Jocelyn Jee Esien, British comedian
 Jocelyn Leary, American cast member on the American sketch comedy Don't Look Now (1983 TV series)
 Jocelyn Lovell, Canadian cyclist
 Jocelyn McCallum, Australian softball player
 Jocelyn Moorhouse, Australian film director
 Jocelyn Pook, English violist
 Jocelyn Thibault, Canadian hockey player
 Jocelyn Wildenstein, Swiss-American socialite known for having a cat-like appearance due to extensive cosmetic surgery

Joscelin
Joscelin, Bishop of Paris, 9th century French cleric
Joscelin I, Count of Edessa (died 1131), Crusader lord
Joscelin II, Count of Edessa (died 1159), Crusader lord
Joscelin III of Edessa (1159 – after 1190), Crusader lord
Joscelin of Louvain, Brabantian/English nobleman

Josceline
Josceline de Bohon, Bishop of Salisbury
Josceline Percy, officer in the British Royal Navy
Josceline Percy, English politician
Josceline Percy, 11th Earl of Northumberland, English nobleman
Josceline Dimbleby, British cookery writer

Joscelyn
Joscelyn Godwin, British composer, musicologist, and translator
Joss Stone, British singer whose birth name is Joscelyn Eve Stoker

Jocelin
 Jocelin (d. 1199), abbot of Melrose, and Bishop of Glasgow
 Jocelin of Soissons (d. 1152)
 Jocelin of Wells, a 13th-century bishop of Bath and Wells
 Jocelin de Dijon (fl. 1200–25), trouvère

Jocelyne
 Jocelyne Betty Okagua Apiafi, Nigerian politician
 Jocelyne Lanois, French-Canadian singer
 Jocelyne Villeton, French long-distance runner

Joycelyn
Joycelyn Elders, American Public Health Administrator

Joselyn
 Joselyn Cano, American Model
 Joselyn Dumas, Ghanaian television host
 Joselyn Alejandra Niño, Mexican criminal

Surname

Frances Jocelyn, Viscountess Jocelyn, British photographer
Harry Jocelyn (1933–2000), Australian Latinist and classical scholar
John Joscelyn, an English antiquarian
Nathaniel Jocelyn, American painter
For the Jocelyns of Hyde Hall near Sawbridgeworth, see the Earl of Roden

Places
Jocelyn, Ontario, Canada

Opera
Jocelyn composed by Benjamin Godard

Music
Jocelyn Flores, song by XXXTentacion

"Josslyn", song by Olivia O'Brien

See also
Joslin

English given names
French feminine given names
French unisex given names